Kyle Alexander Hoffer (born October 26, 1989) is an American soccer player.

Career

College and amateur
Hoffer grew up in Bardonia, New York, and attended Albertus Magnus High School, where he earned team MVP honors in 2005 and 2006 and was named the 2006 Rockland County's Player of the Year. He played one year of college soccer at the State University of New York at Oneonta, where he earned rookie of the year honors, before transferring to St. John's University prior to his sophomore year.

During his college years he also played with the Brooklyn Knights in the USL Premier Development League.  On June 26, 2013,

Professional
Hoffer signed his first professional contract in 2011 when he was signed by F.C. New York of the USL Professional Division. He made his professional debut on April 9, 2011 in New York's first-ever game, a 3–0 loss to Orlando City, and scored his first professional goal on May 7 in a 1–1 tie with the Harrisburg City Islanders.

At the end of the 2011 USL Pro season, Hoffer signed with Ekenäs IFof the Finnish second division.

Hoffer returned to USL Pro for the 2012 season when he signed with Charleston Battery on January 6, 2012.

After spending 2014 with USL Pro club Rochester Rhinos, Hoffer moved to new USL franchise Austin Aztex for the 2015 season.

References

External links
 St. John's bio

1989 births
Living people
American soccer players
Oneonta State Red Dragons men's soccer players
St. John's Red Storm men's soccer players
Brooklyn Knights players
F.C. New York players
Charleston Battery players
VSI Tampa Bay FC players
Rochester New York FC players
Austin Aztex players
Association football midfielders
People from Englewood, New Jersey
Soccer players from New Jersey
USL League Two players
USL Championship players
Ekenäs IF players
American expatriate soccer players
Expatriate footballers in Finland
American expatriate sportspeople in Finland
Soccer players from New York (state)
People from Rockland County, New York